Nemaster is a monotypic genus of echinoderms belonging to the family Comatulida. The only species is Nemaster grandis.

The species is found in Central America and Australia.

References

Comatulidae
Crinoid genera
Monotypic echinoderm genera